Cephalosporin C is an antibiotic of the cephalosporin class.  It was isolated from a fungus of the genus Acremonium and first characterized in 1961. Although not a very active antibiotic itself, synthetic analogs of cephalosporin C, such as cefalotin, became some of the first marketed cephalosporin antibiotic drugs.

Cephalosporin C strongly absorbs ultraviolet light, is stable to acid, is non-toxic and has in vivo activity in mice. Cephalosporin C, which has a similar structure to penicillin N, was never commercialized.

Cephalosporin C was a lead compound for the discovery and production of many other cephalosporins. Cephalosporins are drugs used for some people who are allergic to penicillin.

Uses 
Cephalosporins are used to treat bacterial infections such as respiratory tract infections, skin infections and urinary tract infections.  When a cephalosporin or any other antibiotic is given as a treatment, the medication should be taken for the fully prescribed time even if symptoms disappear.

Mechanism of action
Cephalosporin C acts by inhibiting penicillin binding proteins.

Side effects 
These are allergic reactions to the drug and require medical attention:
 itching
 swelling
 dizziness
 rash
 trouble breathing
 vomiting
 severe stomach cramps
 bloody diarrhea
 fever
 weakness
 fast heartbeat

Chemistry 
Cephalosporin C has weak activity to the staphylococci infection, which was 0.1% activity. This decrease in activity was due to the replacement of the D-α-aminoadipic acid side chain with phenylacetic acid.

Biochemistry 

Cephalosporin C is the product of the biosynthesis pathway of third generation cephalosporins. This is done by exchanging the acetyl CoA into DAC.

To achieve cephalosporin C as the end product, there are 6 genes reported to be in control of the pathway.

References

Cephalosporin antibiotics